Warlus is the name of 2 communes in northern France:

Warlus, Pas-de-Calais
Warlus, Somme

oc:Warlus